The Kingston upon Hull Central by-election of 1926 was fought on 29 November 1926 when Joseph Kenworthy changed party allegiance from the Liberal Party to the Labour Party and sought re-election with the change of party allegiance.  Kenworthy retained the seat.

References

By-elections to the Parliament of the United Kingdom in Yorkshire and the Humber constituencies
1926 elections in the United Kingdom
1926 in England
Elections in Kingston upon Hull
1920s in the East Riding of Yorkshire
20th century in Kingston upon Hull